J. Hyatt Downing (1888-1973) was an American novelist and short story writer. His short stories were published in Scribner's Magazine and Reader's Digest. His novel about Sioux City, Iowa, Sioux City, was a bestseller.

Early life
John Hyatt Downing was born on March 18, 1888, in Granville, Iowa. He grew up in Hawarden, Iowa and Blunt, South Dakota. He worked on his father's ranch and as a railroad surveyor for the Northwestern Railroad, hotel's night clerk and shepherd in Wyoming, Nebraska and the Black Hills. He then graduated from the University of South Dakota in 1913.

Career
Downing worked for the Internal Revenue Service in Aberdeen, South Dakota. He managed an alfalfa farm in Carlsbad, New Mexico, in 1921–1925. Downing worked an insurance agent in Saint Paul, Minnesota, in 1925–1930. At the same time, he began writing short stories for Scribner's Magazine.

His first novel, A Prayer for Tomorrow, was a semi-autobiographical account of the ranching culture in South Dakota. He moved to Sioux City, Iowa, and wrote four more novels, including Sioux City, which became a bestseller and book of the month. Downing sold the rights to a film production company and moved to California, but the movie was never made. Instead, he wrote publicity and radio scripts for Twentieth Century Fox instead. His last short story was published in Reader's Digest in 1963. His novel Four on the Trail was a paperback Western only released in England.

Personal life and death
Downing married Mary McGinnis. They had son, John, in 1921. Downing contracted tuberculosis in 1925. Downing and his family first resided in Sioux City, Iowa, and later in Pismo Beach, California.

Downing died in 1973 in Pismo Beach, California, at 85.

Works

Novels
A Prayer for Tomorrow (1938)
Hope of Living (1939)
Sioux City (1940)
Anthony Trant (1941)
The Harvest is Late (1944)
Garth (unpublished novel)

Short stories
And Then It Was Spring
Buffalo Grass
The Butte
Chicken Business
Closed Roads (Scribner's Magazine, August 1925)
The Distance to Casper (Scribner's Magazine, February, 1927)
Dream Street
The First Illusion (Scribner's Magazine, May 1930)
Furlough (Farm Journal, July 1943)
Girl of Many Faces
The Great MacLeod (Collier's, 1948)
The Harvesters
Head of the Family
Headwork (Liberty, November 6, 1946)
The House on Bad Woman Creek
How Does Your Garden Grow
If Darryl Zanuck...
Just for the Night (Good Housekeeping, October 1940)
The Longer Shot
A Man Needs a Horse (Collier's, February 23, 1946)
The Man Who Killed Jeb Stuart
The Marshal's Friend (True, April 1947)
Old Cimmarron - On the Santa Fe Trail (Westways, August 1951)
One of the Boys
Out of the Dark (Liberty, May 10 and 24, 1947)
The Return of Willie Scroggs (Country Gentleman, July 1947)
Rewards (Scribner's Magazine, April 1926)
The Sage of Virgin Creek
Sir, the King!
Star Without Glamor (Collier's, October 20, 1945)
Sun-Kissed Bangtails (Collier's, March 2, 1946)
This Is Where He Walked
Treasury of the Past (Holiday, November 1946)
We Went West (Scribner's Magazine, May 1928)
Woman In A Hurry

References

External links
 The J. Hyatt Downing Papers are housed at the University of Iowa Special Collections & University Archives.

1888 births
1973 deaths
Novelists from Iowa
Writers from South Dakota
University of South Dakota alumni
20th-century American novelists
People from Hawarden, Iowa
People from Hughes County, South Dakota
American male novelists
American male short story writers
20th-century American short story writers
20th-century American male writers
People from Aberdeen, South Dakota
People from Sioux City, Iowa
People from Pismo Beach, California